Sidewalk is the third studio album by Australian rock band Icehouse, released on 26 June 1984 by Chrysalis Records and Regular Records. It peaked at No. 8 on the National albums chart. Founding member Iva Davies used the Fairlight CMI digital sampling synthesizer on this more sombre and reflective album. This is the first studio album that bassist Guy Pratt worked on as a member of the band. Pratt would later become a session musician, and go on to work with artists such as Pink Floyd, Roxy Music, David Bowie, Madonna and Michael Jackson.

In 2002, Warner Music re-released the album, digitally remastered by Davies and Ryan Scott, with four bonus tracks.

Use in other media
Included are two tracks, "Shot Down" and "The Mountain", that were used for the Russell Mulcahy 1984 film Razorback. Iva Davies also composed the film's score.

Track listing
All songs written by Iva Davies.

Personnel
Credits are adapted from the album's liner notes.

Icehouse
 Iva Davies – vocals; guitar; oboe; Fairlight CMI programming; drum programming
 Robert Kretschmer – guitar; backing vocals
 John Lloyd – drums; percussion; backing vocals
 Guy Pratt – bass guitar; backing vocals
 Andy Qunta – keyboards

Additional musicians
 Joe Camilleri – saxophone (tracks 2, 3, 5, 10)
 Remy Corps – backing vocals (track 1)
 James SK Wān – bamboo flute

Production
 Iva Davies – producer; engineer; mixing 
 John Brand – producer
 Andy Hilton – engineer 
 Jim Taig – assistant engineer
 David Jerden – mixing

Charts

Weekly charts

Year-end charts

Certifications

References

External links
 

1984 albums
Icehouse (band) albums
Chrysalis Records albums
Regular Records albums
Sidewalks in art